= Dariush Mirshekar Syahkal =

English engineer

Dariush Mirshekar Syahkal from the University of Essex, Colchester, UK was named Fellow of the Institute of Electrical and Electronics Engineers (IEEE) in 2014 for contributions to electromagnetic modeling for microwave devices.
